Gianluca Branco (born 20 September 1970) is an Italian former professional boxer who competed from 1995 to 2014. He held the European super-lightweight title twice between 2001 and 2009, the European Union welterweight title from 2012 to 2013, the European welterweight title from 2014 to 2016, and challenged twice for a world title in 2004 and 2006. Gianluca is the younger brother of former boxer Silvio Branco.

Professional career
Branco made his professional debut on 7 April 1995, knocking out Aladar Horvath in six rounds. Fighting almost exclusively in his native Italy, he would spend the next nine years undefeated, save for a points draw against Viktor Baranov on 19 October 1998. Branco won his first major regional championship—the vacant European light-welterweight title—on 23 June 2001, with a majority decision victory over Gabriel Mapouka. Two successful defences of the title were made, against George Scott on 17 November 2001 (sixth-round technical decision) and Allan Vester on 9 March 2002 (tenth-round stoppage).

On 24 January 2004, Branco fought for his first world championship—the vacant WBC light-welterweight title—against veteran Arturo Gatti. This was also Branco's first visit to the United States, where Gatti was an established star. Branco started off well, counterpunching the combinations of Gatti, until the latter injured his hand severely by landing a punch on Branco's hip in round five. Gatti then had to rely entirely on his jab to stay out of trouble for the remainder of the fight. By the tenth round, with the fight still close, Gatti turned the tide decisively in his favour when he scored a knockdown against Branco. By the end of twelve rounds, Gatti won a clear unanimous decision (UD) to hand Branco his first loss.

Branco would receive a second opportunity at a world title on 4 March 2006, this time against WBO light-welterweight champion Miguel Cotto. From the opening round, Branco had no answer for the undefeated superstar, who stopped him in eight rounds. On 16 May 2008, Branco won his second European light-welterweight title. Despite suffering a knockdown in the second round, he went on to claim a split decision over the defending champion Lynes. Branco made one defence, on 19 December 2008, stopping Juho Tolppola in nine hard-fought rounds.

Having moved up in weight, Branco made his first of two attempts at winning the European welterweight title, on 26 March 2010, but lost a UD to Matthew Hatton. On 10 November 2012, Branco won the vacant European Union welterweight title with a UD over Krzysztof Bienias. Once defence was made, on 22 February 2013, in a UD victory against Lukasz Maciec. On 22 November 2014, Branco succeeded in his second attempt at winning the now-vacant European welterweight title, by forcing Rafał Jackiewicz to retire in his corner after six rounds.

Professional boxing record

References

External links

Italian male boxers
Light-welterweight boxers
Welterweight boxers
1970 births
Sportspeople from the Metropolitan City of Rome Capital
People from Civitavecchia
Living people
European Boxing Union champions